The Guyana women's national under-20 football team is the association football women's team that represents the Guyana at the under-20 level. The team competes in the CONCACAF Women's U-20 Championship and FIFA U-20 Women's World Cup.

History
The Guyana national women's under-20 teams represents the country women's under-20 teams in the various competitions. The team have played their debut game against Suriname on 17 January 2002 at Saint Paul, Antigua and Barbuda which lost by 1–7 goals. Most recently in the 2020 they have reached into Quarter-final of 2020 CONCACAF Women's U-20 Championship which ever team history best performance. In the 2022 in their regional tournament CONCACAF Women's U-20 Championship they have exit from    Round of 16. The team have not yet qualified to the FIFA U-20 Women's World Cup.

Current squad
The following squad was named recently finished 2022 CONCACAF Women's U-20 Championship.

Fixtures and results
Legend

2022

Competitive records

FIFA U-20 Women's World Cup

CONCACAF Women's U-20 Championship

References

South American women's national association football teams
Caribbean women's national association football teams